Luis Enrique Benítez Ojeda (born 20 October 1969) is a Mexican politician affiliated with the Institutional Revolutionary Party. As of 2014 he served as Deputy of the LX Legislature of the Mexican Congress representing Durango.

References

1969 births
Living people
Politicians from Durango
People from Durango City
Institutional Revolutionary Party politicians
21st-century Mexican politicians
Deputies of the LX Legislature of Mexico
Members of the Chamber of Deputies (Mexico) for Durango